Software Ganda is a 2014 Indian Kannada-language romantic comedy comedy drama film directed and co-produced by Venkatesh. The film features Jaggesh and Nikita Thukral in the lead roles besides Sakshi Agarwal & Srinath in other pivotal role. The film's score and soundtrack is composed by Veer Samarth while the cinematography is by Nagesh Acharya. 

The film released on 5 December 2014 worldwide. The satellite rights for the film was sold for 16 crore to a leading television channel. The film is a remake of the 2012 Malayalam film My Boss  which itself was based on the 2009 American film The Proposal.

Premise
Manu, a software engineer, faces difficulty working under Priya, his short-tempered NRI boss. Priya is forced to leave India due to visa issues and she decides to marry Manu for her selfish needs.

Cast
 Jaggesh  as Manu
 Nikita Thukral as Priya S Rao
 Srinath as Manu's father
 Sakshi Agarwal as Nancy
 Kuri Prathap
 R. T. Rama

Music
The film score and soundtrack has been composed by Veer Samarth and the audio has been brought out by Anand Audio label. The lyrics are written by Dr. Nagendra Prasad and Hrudaya Shiva. An Atlanta-based singer, Rekha Pallath, made her debut in playback singing with this film.

References

External links
 Puneeth & Sudeep at "Software Ganda" launch
 Jaggesh Washes His Hands of Software Ganda 
 Jaggesh and Nikita Thukral attend audio release of Software Ganda in Bangalore
 Atlanta singer Rekha Pallath makes playback debut with 'Software Ganda'

2014 films
2010s Kannada-language films
Indian comedy-drama films
Kannada remakes of Malayalam films
Sham marriage